The Archdiocese of Minsk–Mohilev is a Latin Church ecclesiastical territory or archdiocese of the Catholic Church covering the cities of Minsk and Mogilev in Belarus. It is a metropolitan see with three suffragan dioceses.

History
 9 August 1798: established as Diocese of Minsk from the Metropolitan Archdiocese of Mohilev
 13 April 1991: elevated to Metropolitan Archdiocese of Minsk – Mohilev

Special churches
Minor Basilicas:
National Sanctuary of the Mother of God of Budslau, Budslau
Church of Saint Barbara in Zamoscie
Church of the Assumption of the Blessed Virgin Mary  in Mstsislaw

Leadership
 Archbishops of Minsk-Mohilev:
 Archbishop Iosif Staneuski (14 September 2021 – present)
 Archbishop Tadevuš Kandrusievič (21 September 2007 – 3 January 2021)
 Bishop Antoni Dziamjanka (Apostolic Administrator 14 June 2006 – 21 September 2007)
 Cardinal Kazimierz Świątek (13 April 1991 – 14 June 2006)
 Bishops of Minsk:
 Archbishop Tadevuš Kandrusievič (Apostolic Administrator 10 May 1989 – 13 April 1991)
 Bishop Boļeslavs Sloskāns (Apostolic Administrator 13 August 1926 – 18 April 1981)
 Bishop Zygmunt Łoziński (2 November 1917 – 28 October 1925)
 Bishop Jakub Ignacy Dederko, S.J. (1798 – 13 February 1829)

Suffragan dioceses

 Grodno
 Pinsk
 Vitebsk

See also
Roman Catholicism in Belarus
Church of Saint Virgin Mary (Rakaŭ)

Notes

External links
 GCatholic.org
 Catholic Hierarchy

Roman Catholic dioceses in Belarus
Religious organizations established in 1798
Organizations based in Minsk
History of Minsk